This is a list of microlepidoptera that are found in Israel. It also acts as an index to the species articles and forms part of the full List of moths of Israel.

Superfamily Yponomeutoidea

Family Yponomeutidae
Kessleria saxifragae  (Stainton, 1868)
Prays oleae  (Bernard, 1788)
Prays citri  Millière, 1873
Yponomeuta albonigratus  Gershenson, 1972
Yponomeuta cagnagellus  (Hübner, 1813)
Yponomeuta meridionalis  Gershenson, 1972

Family Plutellidae
Plutella porrectella  (Linnaeus, 1758)
Plutella xylostella  (Linnaeus, 1788)

Family Ypsolophidae
Ypsolopha asperella  (Linnaeus, 1761)
Ypsolopha dentella  (Fabricius, 1775)
Ypsolopha eremellus  Amsel, 1933
Ypsolopha instabilella  (Mann, 1866)
Ypsolopha mucronella  (Scopoli, 1763)
Ypsolopha persicella  (Fabricius, 1787)
Ypsolopha sculpturella  (Herrich-Schäffer, 1854)

See also
Microlepidoptera
Moths
Lepidoptera
List of moths of Israel

External links
 New Records Of Yponomeutoid Moths (Lepidoptera, Yponomeutidae, Plutellidae) From Israel

Microlepidoptera